The 1938 Pacific Southwest Championships was a combined men's and women's amateur tennis tournament played on outdoor hard courts at the Los Angeles Tennis Club in Los Angeles, California in the United States. It was the 12th edition of the tournament and took place from September 25 through October 4, 1938. Adrian Quist and Dorothy Bundy won the singles titles. The tournament finished two days behind schedule due to the late arrival of several players who participated in the U.S. National Championships.

Finals

Men's singles
 Adrian Quist defeated  Harry Hopman 6–3, 0–6, 6–4, 6–4

Women's singles
 Dorothy Bundy defeated  Sarah Palfrey Fabyan 6–4, 6–4

Men's doubles
 Harry Hopman /  Leonard Schwartz defeated  John Bromwich /  Adrian Quist 3–6, 6–2, 6–4, 6–4

Women's doubles
 Simonne Mathieu /  Margot Lumb defeated  Sarah Palfrey Fabyan /  Gracyn Wheeler 6–2, 6–3

Mixed doubles
 Sarah Palfrey Fabyan /  Don Budge defeated  Nell Hopman /  Harry Hopman 3–6, 6–3, 10–8

References

Los Angeles Open (tennis)
Pacific Southwest Championships
Pacific Southwest Championships